The League of Women Voters (LWV or the League) is a nonprofit, nonpartisan political organization in the United States. Founded in 1920, its ongoing major activities include registering voters, providing voter information, and advocating for voting rights. In addition, the LWV works with partners that share its positions and supports a variety of progressive public policy positions, including campaign finance reform, health care reform, gun control and LGBT+ rights.

The League was founded as the successor to the National American Woman Suffrage Association, which had led the nationwide fight for women's suffrage. The initial goals of the League were to educate women to take part in the political process and to push forward legislation of interest to women. As a nonpartisan organization, an important part of its role in American politics has been to register and inform voters, but it also lobbies for issues of importance to its members, which are selected at its biennial conventions. Its effectiveness has been attributed to its policy of careful study and documentation of an issue before taking a position.

The League's founder, Carrie Chapman Catt felt strongly that first NAWSA and then the League of Women Voters should be nonpartisan. In founding the League of Women Voters, Catt sought to create a political process that was rational and issue-oriented, dominated by citizens, not politicians. She feared that alliance with political parties would reduce the independence of these organizations and swallow up their concerns in more partisan concerns. In addition, by endorsing one candidate the organization would inevitably lose the support of the opposing candidate.   As time passed, women's political organizations did find that political parties redefined issues of concern to them as "women's issues" and pushing them aside.

In 1921, the League was instrumental in passing the Sheppard-Towner Maternity and Infancy Protection Act, providing federal aid for maternal and child care programs.
In the 1930s, the League was supportive of New Deal programs such as Social Security and the Food and Drug Acts. In 1945, the League advocated for the United Nations, the World Bank, and the International Monetary Fund, and was recognized by the UN as a permanent observer, giving it access to most meetings and relevant documentation.

  
 In the 1950s, League member Dorothy Kenyon was attacked as a Communist by Joseph McCarthy and president Percy Maxim Lee testified before Congress against Senator Joseph McCarthy's abuse of congressional investigative powers.
  In 1960, the League supported the Resources and Conservation Act of 1960 (S. 2549), beginning a long history of environmental engagement. 
 In 1969, the League was one of the first organizations in the United States calling for normalizing relations with China. 

The League has not been a progressive organization in all its actions. Throughout the first part of its history, the League of Women Voters was not welcoming to women of color and its predecessor NAWSA ignored issues involving race due to fears that it would reduce support for equal suffrage. 
In the 1960s, the league ultimately supported the Civil Rights Act of 1964 and the Voting Rights Act of 1965, but their efforts came too late to have major impact. After first refusing to oppose discrimination in housing in 1966, the 1968 program included opposition to discrimination in housing and support for presidential suffrage for citizens of Washington DC. 

In the 1970s, after years of opposition to the Equal Rights Amendment as proposed by the National Women's Party, the League offered support to an Equal Rights Amendment.  In 1974, the League began to admit men.  The League fought for the 1982 Amendments to the Voting Rights Act and in the 1990s was important in the passage of Motor Voter.
  In 1998, the League elected its first African-American president, Carolyn Jefferson-Jenkins.
 She served two terms, until 2002, and wrote a book "The untold story of women of color in the League of Women Voters" documenting the history of the League and women of color.

In 2002, the League supported the Help America Vote Act (with some reservations about the final compromise)
  and the Bipartisan Campaign Reform Act.

History

Founding

The League of Women Voters came about as the merger of two existing organizations, the long-established National American Woman Suffrage Association (NAWSA) and the National Council of Women Voters (NCWV), created in 1911. 

The founding goals of the National League of Women Voters were to educate women on election processes and lobby for favorable legislation on women's issues. These were the same as the goals of the NCWV, which had been founded by Emma Smith DeVoe after her proposal for such an organization was rebuffed at the 1909 National American Woman Suffrage Association (NAWSA) convention in Seattle. When her proposal was ignored, DeVoe founded the National Council of Women Voters in 1911. She recruited western suffragists and organizations to join the league.

Ten years later, prior to the 1919 Convention of the NAWSA (in St. Louis, Missouri), Carrie Chapman Catt began negotiating with DeVoe to merge her organization with a new league that would be the successor to the NAWSA. Even though continuing as the NCWV might have made sense because the goals were essentially those that Catt proposed for the new organization, Catt was concerned that DeVoe's alignment with the more radical Alice Paul might discourage conservative women from joining it and thus proposed the formation of a new league.  As fifteen states had already ratified the 19th Amendment, the women wanted to move forward with a plan to educate women on the voting process and shepherd their participation.

A motion was made at the 1919 NAWSA convention to merge the two organizations into a successor, the National League of Women Voters. Although not all members of either organization were in favor of a merger, the merger was officially completed on January 6, 1920. For the first year the league operated as a committee of the NAWSA. The formal organization of the League was drafted at the 1920 Convention held in Chicago.

In her presidential address on March 24, 1919, at the above-mentioned NAWSA convention, Catt had said:

Carrie Chapman Catt was named honorary chairman of the League instead of president because she insisted that it was for younger and fresher women to lead the new work.

In subsequent years, due to the increasing influence of women in politics, the league has evolved a more inclusive mission, to "protect and expand voting rights and ensure everyone is represented in our democracy."

1920–1930

During the 1920s, the League of Women Voters of New York  sent an annual questionnaire to candidates for local office, and published the answers in the publication "Information for Voters."
In 1929, the questionnaire covered maintaining the 5 cent subway fare, creation of a permanent city planning board, immediate action on a sewage and waste disposal plant, unlimited building heights in certain districts, and reclassification of civil service employees to provide automatic salary increases.

In early 1921, the League of Women Voters of New York reported an increase in the number of members after Governor Nathan L. Miller attacked the League, calling it a "menace" to our form of government. The organization launched a state-wide campaign of education to inform "misguided individuals laboring under such misapprehensions."

In 1923, a special committee of the national League of Women Voters picked twelve women as the "greatest living American women." They were Jane Addams, Cecilia Beaux, Annie Jump Cannon, Carrie Chapman Catt, Anna Botsford Comstock, Minnie Maddern Fiske, Louise Homer, Julia Lathrop, Florence Rena Sabin, M. Carey Thomas, Martha Van Rensselaer, and Edith Wharton.

At the 1926 convention of the national League, Belle Sherwin, the League president, emphasized education in politics as the right road toward true democracy.
Whether it is possible to develop in this country an education which will qualify citizens to be partners in government is a question to face squarely.

For many, education today is either remote and limited to a brief period or is highly specialized for vocational purposes. Education for active citizenship has hardly been tried.  
She went on to mention "the modest attempts of schools here and there to teach critical reading of the newspapers and other means of avoiding mob-mindedness."
Prohibition and birth control were hot issues that year, but were not included in the subjects for study and legislation during the ensuing year.

In 1926, The New York League together with the Women's National Republican Club established information booths in seven department stores, explaining to women how to register to vote, and installed a voting machine at League headquarters to demonstrate how to vote. The League members explained literacy tests and requirements and hours for registration. A frequent question involved the status of an American woman married to an immigrant. The League also presented a series of pre-election talks, including a talk on "National and State Legislators," "The Judiciary," and "Machinery of Elections."

Also in 1926, the New York League regional director Mrs. Charles L. Tiffany emphasized the League's non-partisan nature, saying that "The League of Women Voters is taking no part in any campaign. ... If any individual members of the league wish to take part in the campaign, they will do so as individuals and not as members of the league."

On October 17, 1929, Belle Sherwin, the president of the League of Women Voters, and Ruth Morgan of New York City headed a delegation to ask President Herbert Hoover to support the renewal of Federal aid to the States in maternity and infancy work.

At the 1929 convention of the League of Women Voters of New York, the members voted for a New York State prohibition enforcement act. They also voted to favor old age pensions and ask the Legislature to give women the right to do jury service, to permit physicians to give contraceptive information to married persons, and to extend the benefits of workmen's compensation for all occupational diseases.

1930–1940

1940–1950

1950–1960

1960–1970

1970–1980
In 1975, a bill entitled "The Indian Law Enforcement Improvement Act" was introduced in the Senate and supported by the League of Women Voters of Nebraska, saying "We support self determination and therefore self government of all citizens, in this case Native Americans." After two days of hearings, the bill was not reported out of committee.

1980–1990

1990–2000

In 1993, the League pushed for the adoption of the National Voter Registration Act of 1993, which requires states to offer voter registration at all driver's license agencies, at social service agencies, and through the mail.

2000–2010

2010–present

In 2002, the League supported the Help America Vote Act (with some reservations about the final compromise)
  and the Bipartisan Campaign Finance Reform Act.

In 2020, the League of Women Voters supported Native Americans in seeking to remove restrictions on ballot delivery from reservations.

The Native American voting rights group Four Directions filed a suit on behalf of six voters from the Navajo Nation asking the court to extend the deadline for Arizona counties to receive the ballots of voters, because of "lack of home mail delivery, the need for language translation, lack of access to public transportation and lack of access to any vehicle." The court declined to extend the deadline due to lack of standing of the plaintiffs.

The League of Women Voters of Arizona filed an amicus curiae, saying that 
Most Arizonans take access to mail receipt and delivery as a given. By contrast, the District Court recognized the painful reality that "several variables make voting by mail difficult” for Native American voters. More specifically, “[m]ost Navajo Nation residents do not have access to standard mail service,” including home delivery, and must travel “lengthy distance[s]” to access postal services—a burden compounded by “socioeconomic factors.”

In 2021, the League of Women Voters of Florida partnered with Voteriders to get word out to eligible voters about the changes made due to Floria Senate Bill 90, signed into law in May 2021. The Florida League also partnered with the Black Voters Matter Fund and the Florida Alliance for Retired Americans to file lawsuits against the changes. The trial court struck down multiple provisions of the law but the 11th U.S. Circuit Court of Appeals issued a stay reinstating the restrictive law.

Activities
The LWV sponsored the United States presidential debates in 1976, 1980 and 1984. On October 2, 1988, the LWV's 14 trustees voted unanimously to pull out of the debates, and on October 3 they issued a press release condemning the demands of the major candidates' campaigns. LWV President Nancy Neuman said that the debate format would "perpetrate a fraud on the American voter" and that the organization did not intend to "become an accessory to the hoodwinking of the American public." All presidential debates since 1988 have been sponsored by the Commission on Presidential Debates, a bipartisan organization run by the two major parties.

State and local leagues host candidate debates to provide candidates' positions at all levels of government.

In 2012, LWV created National Voter Registration Day, a day when volunteers work to register voters and increase participation.

The League sponsors voter's guides including Smart Voter and Voter's Edge, which was launched in collaboration with MapLight. The League, including state and local leagues, runs VOTE411.org, a bilingual website that allows voters to input their address and get candidate and election information tailored to their location.

Policy views

The League lobbies for legislation at the national, state, and local levels. Positions on national issues are determined by decisions at the most recent national convention. Members of state and local leagues determine their leagues' positions on state and local issues, consistent with the national positions.

The League was founded by suffragists fighting for the right of women to vote and has always been concerned with issues around voting and representative government. Other issue areas in which the League currently advocates are international relations, natural resources, and social policy.

Voting and representative government
In 1993, the League pushed for the adoption of the National Voter Registration Act of 1993, which requires states to offer voter registration at all driver's license agencies, at social service agencies, and through the mail.

The League works with the non-partisan VoteRiders organization to spread state-specific information on voter ID requirements. In 2002, the League endorsed passage of the Bipartisan Campaign Reform Act, which banned soft money in federal elections and made other reforms in campaign finance laws. It was also a major proponent of the Help America Vote Act.

In 2010, the League opposed the Supreme Court decision Citizens United v. Federal Election Commission, which removed limits on corporate contributions to candidates. It filed an amicus brief in support of the FEC.

The League supports the DISCLOSE Act, which would provide for greater and faster public disclosure of campaign spending and combat the use of "dark money" in U.S. elections.

The League currently opposes restrictive photo ID laws and supports  campaign finance reform in the United States, including public financing of elections, restrictions on spending by candidates, and abolishing super-PACs.

International relations

The League lobbied for the establishment of the United Nations, and later became one of the first groups to receive status as a nongovernmental organization with the U.N. The League was active from the beginning in promoting world peace and international organizations. At the second League of Women Voters convention, in 1921, Carrie Chapman Catt spoke, and said:
The people in this room tonight could put an end to war. There is no audience in the world that won't applaud him who talks of world peace. Everybody wants to and every one does nothing.

I am for a league of nations, a Republican league or any kind the Republicans are in. I believe it is the duty of every one who wants the world to disarm to compel action at Washington.

Our country is not judged by its parties; it is judged as a nation. But why don't we do something? I ask you: Is there anybody anywhere with an earnest crusading spirit who is trying to arouse America? No. We are as stolid and as inactive as if we did not face the greatest opportunity in history.

We are the appointed leaders. It isn't possible for us to see the horrors of the other side. We go on daily living in a pardise while tragic Europe tries to gather its ruins together. We have waited too long, and we will get another war by waiting.

Let us make a resolution tonight; let us consecrate ourselves to put war out of this world. It is necessary that we rise out of narrow partisanship, that we act as women."

Natural resources

The League supported the Clean Air Act, the Clean Water Act, the Safe Drinking Water Act, the Resource Conservation and Recovery Act and the Kyoto Protocol. The League opposes the proposed Keystone Pipeline project. In January 2013, the League of Women Voters in Hawaii urged President Obama to take action on climate change under the authority given him by the Clean Air Act of 1963.

Social policy
The League opposes school vouchers. In 1999, the League challenged a Florida law that allowed students to use school vouchers to attend other schools.

The League supports universal health care and endorses both Medicaid expansion and the Affordable Care Act.

The League supports the abolition of the death penalty.

LGBT+ rights
LWV supports LGBT+ rights and has stated that "defending our democracy and ending discrimination against the LGBTQ+ community go hand in hand."

Governance

National
A national board of directors consisting of four officers, eight elected directors, and not more than eight board-appointed directors, most of whom reside in the Metro Washington D.C. area, govern the League subject to the Bylaws of the League of Women Voters of the United States. The national board is elected at the national convention and sets position policy.

Local leagues
Local Leagues and state Leagues are organized in order to promote the purposes of the League and to take action on local and state governmental matters. These Leagues (chapters) have their own directors and officers. The national board may withdraw recognition from any state or local League for failure to fulfill recognition requirements.

The League of Women Voters has state and local leagues in all 50 states, the District of Columbia, the Virgin Islands, and Hong Kong.

See also

General
 Women's suffrage
 Women's suffrage in the United States
 Women's suffrage in states of the United States
 National American Woman Suffrage Association
 National Women's Party
 Voting rights in the United States
 Voter suppression
 Elections in the United States
 United States presidential election debate sponsorship
 Woman's Journal

Notable members
 Juanita Jones Abernathy (1931–2019), member of the board of directors of the Atlanta Fulton County League of Women Voters
 Sadie L. Adams (1872–1945), one of the first women to serve on an election board in Chicago and one of the founders of the Alpha Suffrage Club
 Jessie Daniel Ames (1883–1972), a suffragist and civil rights leader from Texas who helped create the anti-lynching movement in the American South and who founded the Texas League of Women Voters and served as its first president until 1923
 Florence Fifer Bohrer (1877–1960), first female senator in the Illinois General Assembly. Served on the National League of Women Board and was the Illinois branch President.
 Inez Mee Boren (1880–?), president of the Northern (California) Section
 Woodnut S. Burr (1861–1952), president of the Los Gatos Branch
 Becky Cain (194?–), former organization president
 Carrie Chapman Catt (1849–1957), founder
 Frances St John Chappelle (1897–1936), State president of the Nevada League of Women Voters
 Edith Chase (1924–2017), served as president from 1965 to 1967
 Shirley Chisholm (1924–2005), first African-American woman in Congress
 Ruth Clusen (1922–2005), an American conservationist, politician, civil rights activist, and government official. She is remembered for serving as the president of the League of Women Voters, for hosting the debates between Jimmy Carter and Gerald Ford, and for serving as the Assistant Secretary of Energy under President Jimmy Carter
 Belle Christie Critchett (1868–1956), an American social activist and suffragist who was part of the Texas Equal Suffrage Association (TESA) and president of the El Paso chapter of the League of Women Voters; she worked with suffragist Maude E. Craig Sampson to increase opportunities for Black women voters
 Minnie Fisher Cunningham (1882–1964), first executive secretary and a founding member of the Woman's National Democratic Club
 Naomi Deutsch (1890–1983), early member and the organizer and director of the Public Health Unit of the Federal Children's Bureau of the Department of Labor of Washington, D.C.
 Janet Stuart Oldershaw Durham (1879–1969), charter member of the Virginia League of Women Voters
 Lillian Feickert (1877–1945), an American suffragist (President of the New Jersey Woman Suffrage Association from 1912 to 1920) who was the first woman from New Jersey to run for United States Senate and who helped organize the New Jersey League of Women Voters
 Nan B. Frank (1886–1980), very active in California League of Women Voters and president of the San Francisco Center of California League of Women Voters
 Edith Jordan Gardner (1877–1965), member of the Oakland Forum
 Edna Fischel Gellhorn (1878–1970), one of the founders and original vice president
 Betty Gilmore, founder and president of the California Women of Golden West
 Ione Grogan (1891–1961), member of the Greensboro League of Women Voters
 Harriet A. Haas (1874–19??)
 Jessie Jack Hooper (1865–1935), an American peace activist and suffragist, who was the first president of the Wisconsin League of Women Voters
 Ethel Edgerton Hurd (1845–1929), a physician, a social reformer and a leader in the woman's suffrage movement in the U.S. state of Minnesota
 Fanny M. Irvin (1854–1949), drafted a resolution to Congress which was passed by the State Legislature, endorsing Woman's Suffrage, and lobbied for the passage of the Constitutional Amendment
 Carolyn Jefferson-Jenkins (1952–), first woman of color to serve as president of the League of Women Votersand the only one in the first hundred years of the League.
 Dorothy Kenyon (1888–1972), American lawyer, judge, and political activist
 Julia Lathrop (1858–1932), director of the United States Children's Bureau from 1912 to 1922, originator of the ideas for the Sheppard-Towner Act, and chosen president of the Illinois League of Women Voters in 1922.
 Katharine Ludington (1869–1953), one of the founders and last president of the Connecticut Woman Suffrage Association
 Deirdre Macnab (1955–), an American women's rights and voting rights activist. She is former president of the League of Women Voters of Florida (LWVFL)[
 Jane Y. McCallum (1877–1957), women's suffrage and Prohibition activist and longest-serving Secretary of State of Texas
 Maybelle Stephens Mitchell (1872–1919), co-founder of the Georgia League
 Maud Wood Park (1871–1955), an African-American suffragist and corresponding secretary of the Alpha Suffrage Club
 Achsa E. Paxman (1885–1968), Utah State Legislature member, president of a State chapter
 Leonora Pujadas-McShine (1910–1995), women's rights activist, founder of Trinidad and Tobago chapter
 Edith Dolan Riley, chairman of the Spokane County Democratic Central Committee
 Margaret Zattau Roan (1905–1975), oversaw League activities in nine Southern states in 1930s
 Eleanor Roosevelt (1884–1962), first lady of the United States 1933-1945 and board member of the New York State League of Woman voters
 Zelia Peet Ruebhausen (1914–1990), United Nations observer appointed 1946, member of several federal policy committees
 Belle Sherwin (1869–1965), a woman's rights activist
 Orfa Jean Shontz (1876–1954), early attorney
 Virginia Kase Solomón, CEO of the League of Women Voters of the United States
 Mary Jane Spurlin (1883–1970), first woman judge in Oregon
 Helen Norton Stevens (1869–1943), treasurer
 F. Josephine Stevenson, State Chairman of Uniform Laws of the National League of Women Voters (1920–21).
 Ursula Batchelder Stone (1900–1985), chaired the Cook County League of Women Voters (1941 to 1944)
 Fay Webb-Gardner (1885–1969), First Lady of North Carolina
 Reah Whitehead (1883–1972), prepared the Drafts of Bills for and assisted in procuring passage of laws for Women's State Reformatory and Filiation Proceedings
 Wilhelmine Wissman Yoakum (1891–1983), treasurer of the California League of Women Voters
 Valeria Brinton Young (1875–1968), a member of the League and president of the Women of the University of Utah

Wikipedia articles on women's suffrage by state

References

Further reading

Selected works published by the League of Women Voters

External links
Web pages

VOTE411.org
 Subject:League of Women Voters (via Internet Archive)
 Miscellaneous materials related to League of Women Voters (via Core.ac.uk)
 Ballotpedia. League of Women Voters

Archives

 
 
 
 Margaret Levi Papers. 1965–1985. 3.17 cubic feet (4 boxes). Contains material collected by Levi on the League of Women Voters from 1967 to 1968.
 Katharine Bullitt Papers. 1950–1991. 68 cubic feet (68 boxes).
 Civil Unity Committee Records. 1938–1965. 24.76 cubic feet (58 boxes). Contains correspondence related to the League of Women Voters.

 
American democracy activists
Election and voting-related organizations based in the United States
Liberal feminist organizations
Non-profit organizations based in Washington, D.C.
Organizations established in 1920
United States presidential debates
Voter turnout organizations
Women's organizations based in the United States
Women's suffrage advocacy groups in the United States